Sarathi (also anglicised as Sarathy) is an epithet of the Hindu deity Krishna used in the epic Mahabharata. It is also a common personal name in South India.

In the Mahabharata, Krishna initially counselled peace to the Pandavas and Kauravas, two closely related families that chose to fight over the Kuru kingdom in northern India. Eventually siding with the Pandavas, he offered his services as a charioteer to Arjuna, the Pandavas' greatest archer. Krishna is thus accorded the title , which translates to "charioteer of Partha" (another name for Arjuna), or  "eternal charioteer". The Bhagavad Gita, considered by many traditions to be Hinduism's most important religious text, consists of a dialogue between Krishna, the charioteer, and Arjuna just before the actual battle begins, where Krishna instructs Arjuna in the principle of dharma in response to his hesitation to fighting against his own relatives.

Symbolism 
In Hinduism, as aligned with Plato's philosophy, the dynamic interaction of persons, horses, and parts are "yoked," "reined," and "bound" together, serving as an allegory for the atman or "self",  and its relationship to the senses and the body.

In the Stri Parva of the Mahabharata, Vidura explains the concept of samsara to his grieving brother Dhritarashtra by offering the metaphor of a chariot and a charioteer.

References 

Titles and names of Krishna
Forms of Krishna